Capture One (also known as Capture One Pro) is a photography software suite. Capture One offers Capture One Pro for desktop, a tool to edit, catalog raw image file process, and tether.
 Capture One works with raw files from many different digital cameras as well as TIFF, PSD, JPEG, and DNG image files. In 2022, Capture One released its iPad app with key tools to edit on the go and Capture One Live, a free collaboration platform for getting feedback in real-time.

Features
Capture One is available for macOS and Microsoft Windows. It is localized for Chinese (simplified), Czech, English, French, German, Italian, Japanese, Korean, Spanish and Swedish.

Features include smart adjustments, advanced color, styles and presets, high dynamic range, skin tone editing, before and after, film grain, healing and cloning tool, dehaze, layers, keystone correction, black and white conversion, ability to print directly from Capture One, and extension to iPad and iPhone with Capture Pilot, noise reduction, color correction, spot removal, High Dynamic Range tools, lens tools and sharpening tools.

Timeline 
 2003: The independent Capture One brand was established and began supporting other camera brands  

 1994: Capture One was only a raw conversion and tethering tool for Phase One cameras

References

Photo software
Image organizers
Raw image processing software
Proprietary cross-platform software
Windows graphics-related software
macOS graphics software